Joshua Alan Sborz (born December 17, 1993) is an American professional baseball pitcher for the Texas Rangers of Major League Baseball (MLB). He was drafted 74th overall by the Los Angeles Dodgers in the 2015 Major League Baseball draft and played for the Dodgers in 2019 and 2020. Sborz played college baseball at the University of Virginia.

Amateur career
Sborz attended McLean High School in McLean, Virginia. He played for the school's baseball team as a pitcher and an infielder, and received all-state and all-Met honors twice. Additionally, he was named Group AAA state Player of the Year in 2012. Sborz committed to playing college baseball at the University of Virginia.

As a freshman with the Cavaliers, Sborz mainly pitched out of the bullpen. He made 30 appearances for Virginia, which was the 10th most in team history. Sborz joined the UVA rotation during his sophomore season and made 15 starts. He started Game 3 of the College World Series finals against Vanderbilt. In 2013 and 2014, he played collegiate summer baseball with the Orleans Firebirds of the Cape Cod Baseball League.

For his junior season, Sborz was moved back to the bullpen and was named the team's closer. As a result of injuries to the starting rotation, Sborz made two starts towards the end of the regular season. He ended the regular season with a 2.49 ERA and was tied with Florida State's Billy Strode for the ACC lead in saves with 12. For his accomplishments, Sborz was named to the All-ACC second-team. On May 19, 2015, he threw a one-hit shutout against Georgia Tech in an ACC Tournament play-in game. Sborz was named the College World Series Most Outstanding Player following UVA's championship run in the 2015 College World Series. He recorded three wins and a save in four games; pitching 13 scoreless innings with 10 strikeouts, four walks and seven hits allowed.

Professional career

Los Angeles Dodgers
The Los Angeles Dodgers selected Sborz in the second round of the 2015 MLB draft. The Dodgers announced his signing on July 8, 2015. He was assigned to the rookie level Ogden Raptors of the Pioneer League to start his career. After pitching in two games for the Raptors he was promoted to the Great Lakes Loons of the Class-A Midwest League. He also made two starts for the Loons and was 0–1 with a 2.84 ERA leading to his promotion again, to the Advanced Class-A Rancho Cucamonga Quakes of the California League on August 14. In nine relief appearances for the Quakes he allowed two runs in 12 innings. He remained with the Quakes for the start of the 2016 season and pitched in 20 games, 19 of which were starts. He was 8–4 with a 2.66 ERA and was named to the mid-season and post-season California League All-Star teams as well as the league pitcher of the year. He was promoted to the Double-A Tulsa Drillers of the Texas League at the end of the season and made 10 relief appearances with them, for a 3.78 ERA.

Sborz spent all of 2017 with Tulsa where he started 24 games with an 8–8 record, 3.86 ERA and 81 strikeouts. In 2018, he appeared in 46 games (all in relief) for Tulsa and AAA Oklahoma City with a 4–2 record and 3.88 ERA with six saves. The Dodgers added him to their 40-man roster after the 2018 season.

Sborz was called up to the Majors for the first time on April 14, 2019, but was optioned back to AAA on April 20 without appearing in any games. He was called back up to the majors on June 20 and made his debut that night. After pitching a scoreless eighth inning. Sborz allowed three runs on two hits and a walk in the following inning without getting an out. He appeared in seven total games in the majors in 2019, pitching nine innings and allowing eight runs to score. He spent most of the season with AAA Oklahoma City, where he was 4–3 with a 4.68 ERA in 50 innings (over 46 appearances) with three saves.

The minor league season was cancelled in 2020 due to the COVID-19 pandemic and Sborz spent most of the season at the Dodgers alternate training site, only appearing in four games in the Majors. He worked 4 innings, striking out two and walking one. The only run he allowed all season was a solo home run by Wil Myers of the San Diego Padres. Sborz was designated for assignment on February 11, 2021.

Texas Rangers
On February 16, 2021, Sborz was traded to the Texas Rangers in exchange for Jhan Zambrano. Over 59 innings for Texas in 2021, Sborz posted a 4–3 record with a 3.97 ERA while striking out 69 batters. Sborz split the 2022 season between Texas and the Round Rock Express of the Triple-A Pacific Coast League. With Texas he posted a 1–0 record with a 6.45 ERA over  innings; with Round Rock he went 3–0 with a 1.61 ERA over  innings.

Personal life
Josh's parents are John and Tina Sborz. He has two sisters, Chrissy and Heather, and an older brother, Jay, who pitched for eight years in the Detroit Tigers organization.  Chrissy is a licensed insurance professional.

References

External links

Virginia Cavaliers bio

1993 births
Living people
People from McLean, Virginia
Baseball players from Virginia
Major League Baseball pitchers
Los Angeles Dodgers players
Texas Rangers players
Virginia Cavaliers baseball players
College World Series Most Outstanding Player Award winners
Orleans Firebirds players
Ogden Raptors players
Great Lakes Loons players
Rancho Cucamonga Quakes players
Tulsa Drillers players
Oklahoma City Dodgers players